Milovice is a town in Nymburk District in the Central Bohemian Region of the Czech Republic. It has about 12,000 inhabitants.

In the 20th century, the history of the town was influenced by the presence of a military base. In the 21st century, Milovice is one of the fastest growing towns with the youngest population.

Administrative parts
Town parts and villages of Benátecká Vrutice, Boží Dar and Mladá are administrative parts of Milovice.

Geography
The western part of the municipal territory lies in the Jizera Table, the eastern part lies in the Central Elbe Table. The Mlynařice stream, a tributary of the Elbe, flows through the territory.

History
The first written mention of Milovice is from 1396.

Since the 1990s, the town Milovice belongs to the fastest growing suburban areas in the Czech Republic mainly thanks to cheap accommodation left by the Soviet Army.

Military base

The first military base was founded in Mladá by the Austro-Hungarian Army in 1904. During World War I, there was a prisoner camp of Russian and Italian soldiers, which has a military cemetery in town. After the War, the newly founded Czechoslovak Army started to use the camp as a main military base in Bohemia. During the German occupation of Czechoslovakia, the base served as a centre for German film propaganda, where fake footage from the Eastern Front was shot.

In 1968 the base came under Soviet control, played an important role during the Warsaw Pact invasion of Czechoslovakia, and became the headquarters for the Central Group of Forces afterwards. They built a massive airport and accommodation for about 100,000 Soviet soldiers and their relatives. The last of the troops left in 1991 and the base was abandoned in 1995. In August 1996, the revitalization of the former military training area began.

Demographics
As of 2022, with an average age of 34.9 years, the town has one of the youngest populations in the country, and the youngest in category of the towns with over 10,000 inhabitants.

Culture
Since 2015, the Let It Roll festival is held at the former airfield for three days in August, with roughly 25,000 attendees.

Sights

The Neo-Gothic Church of Saint Catherine of Alexandria was consecrated in 1907. It was built as a replacement for the destroyed parish complex in the village of Mladá, which was razed to the ground due to the establishment of the military base. The wall decoration dates from 1915 and 1916 and was attended by prisoners of war from the camp.

The international military cemetery was founded in 1915 for victims of the World War I. More than 6,000 people of at least 10 nationalities are buried here, 5,276 of which are Italian, therefore the cemetery is called Italian Cemetery.

Mirákulum in Milovice is a family amusement park that is among the most visited tourist destinations in the Central Bohemian Region.

Milovice Nature Reserve
In January 2015, a group of 14 Exmoor ponies were moved from Exmoor National Park to Milovice Nature Reserve in an effort to save the biodiversity of the location through conservation grazing. Other animals in the reserve include aurochs and European bisons.

Twin towns – sister cities

Milovice is twinned with:
 Kistarcsa, Hungary
 Vynnyky, Ukraine

Gallery

References

External links

Cities and towns in the Czech Republic
Populated places in Nymburk District